Wendeline may refer to:
 1438 Wendeline, a main-belt asteroid
 15268 Wendelinefroger, a main-belt asteroid, named after Wendeline Froger (born 1948)
 Nina Bang (born Nina Henriette Wendeline Ellinger; 1866–1928), a Danish social democratic politician

See also
 Gwendoline (disambiguation)
 Gwendoline